Cardiff City Football Club is a professional association football club based in Cardiff, Wales. The club was founded in 1899 as Riverside A.F.C., by members of a local cricket club, joining the Cardiff & District League the following year. In 1907, the side joined the South Wales Amateur League and changed its name to Cardiff City, later entering the English football league system by joining the Southern Football League in 1910, before being elected into the Football League in 1920. As of the end of the 2017–18 season, the club has won three division titles in the Football League, won promotion on 12 occasions and been relegated 12 times. The club has also achieved some success in domestic cup competitions, winning the FA Cup in 1927, reaching the final on two other occasions, reaching the 2012 League Cup final and winning the Welsh Cup on 22 occasions.

All players who have played between 25 and 99 first-team matches for the club, either as a member of the starting eleven or as a substitute, are listed below. Each player's details include the duration of his career with Cardiff, his typical playing position while with the club, and the number of matches played and goals scored in all senior competitive matches.

No player has finished his Cardiff career on 99 appearances, Patrick Cassidy and Tom Sloan both reached 98 appearances before leaving the club. Sloan is one of three players who played between 25 and 99 games who appeared in the club's 1927 FA Cup Final winning team, the others being Ernie Curtis and Sam Irving. Two players, Davy McDougall and Richie Morgan, went on to manage the team. McDougall was appointed as the club's first manager in 1910 and remained in the role until the following year. Morgan managed the side between 1978 and 1981 before moving into another role at the club. Despite only appearing in 25 matches for Cardiff, Robin Friday is regarded as one of the most notable cult heroes in the club's history due to his performances and his personality. Stan Richards set a club record for the most league goals in a single season with 30 in 1946–47 as the team won promotion from the Third Division South, which stood for 56 years until it was beaten by Robert Earnshaw.

In more recent years, notable players with between 25 and 99 appearances for the club  include Andy Campbell, who scored the winning goal in the 2003 Football League Second Division play-off Final, and Chilean midfielder Gary Medel, who set club transfer fee records on both his arrival in 2013 and his departure the following year. Aaron Ramsey, who spent two spells with the club, remains the youngest player ever to play for the club after making his debut at the age of 16 years and 123 days.

As of September 2022, 10 players listed here are still with the club, so have the opportunity to add to their totals.

Key
Players are arranged by alphabetical order of surname.
Appearances as a substitute are included. This feature of the game was introduced in the Football League at the start of the 1965–66 season.
Statistics are correct as of the match played on 3 September 2022.

List

Notes

References
General

Specific

Players 25-99
 25-99
Cardiff
Association football player non-biographical articles